George Henry Russell (11 August 1902 — after 1935) was an English former professional footballer who played as a full back.

References

1902 births
Date of death missing
English footballers
Portsmouth F.C. players
Watford F.C. players
Northampton Town F.C. players
Bristol Rovers F.C. players
Cardiff City F.C. players
Sheffield United F.C. players
Newport County A.F.C. players
Stafford Rangers F.C. players
Bangor City F.C. players
English Football League players
Association football fullbacks